Llanera de Ranes is a municipality in the comarca of Costera in the Valencian Community, Spain.

The town is located on some flat terrain of the left bank of the Cañoles river. Now a community of 1,000 people, the municipality is quite old.  The town had 44 houses in 1646.  When the Moors were driven out of Spain around 1700, the village became almost a ghost town.  In 1743 there was a serious earthquake that killed many people in the village.  As a result of the disaster, the town of Torrent de Fenollet was annexed, which had been practically emptied by the earthquake.  In 1794, the population of Llanera de Ranes had climbed to 500, and 1897 that had risen to 840.

Major crops grown are citrus (150 Ha), various vegetables, corn and tubers in irrigated lands;  olives (150 Ha), carob, grapes, and cereals are grown in the unirrigated areas.

References

Municipalities in the Province of Valencia
Costera